Qaleh-ye Doktar Omad (also Romanized as Qal‘eh-ye Doktar ‘Omād) is a village in Mohammadabad Rural District, in the Central District of Marvdasht County, Fars Province, Iran. At the 2006 census, its population was 18, in 4 families.

References 

Populated places in Marvdasht County